2112 may  refer to:

 AD 2112, a year in the 22nd century
 2112 BC
 2112 (album), an album by Rush
 "2112" (song)
 John Byrne's 2112, a comic book series prequel to Next Men

See also
 Mars 2112, a space themed restaurant in Times Square, New York City
 2112: The Birth of Doraemon, a 1995 Japanese anime film